Sport Club Slovan Bratislava also referred to as ŠK Slovan, Slovan Bratislava or simply Slovan is a professional football club from Bratislava, Slovakia. The club is historically one of the most successful clubs that dominate the Slovak national football league (Slovak First League).

Notable players
The following players had collected senior international caps for their respective countries. Players whose name is listed in bold represented their countries while playing for Slovan.

Players

European Championship winners
 Jozef Čapkovič
 Koloman Gögh
 Marián Masný
 Anton Ondruš
 Ján Pivarník
 Ján Švehlík
 Alexander Vencel

World Cup players

 Michal Benedikovič (1954)
 Ján Čapkovič (1970)
 Alexander Horváth (1970)
 Ivan Hrdlička (1970)
 Vladimír Hrivnák (1970)
 Karol Jokl (1970)
 Vladimír Kinier (1990)
 Marián Masný (1982)
 Pavol Molnár (1962)
 Anton Moravčík (1958)
 Jozef Orth (1938)
 Emil Pažický (1954)
 Ján Popluhár (1958, 1962)
 Teodor Reimann (1954)
 Kornel Saláta (2010)
 Viliam Schrojf (1958, 1962)
 Alexander Vencel (1970)
 Ján Zlocha (1970)

References

players

Slovan Bratislava
Association football player non-biographical articles
Slovan Bratislava